The Fourth Marx cabinet (German: Viertes Kabinett Marx) was the 15th democratically elected government during the Weimar Republic. The cabinet was named after Reichskanzler (chancellor) Wilhelm Marx. On 1 February 1927 it replaced his Third Marx cabinet. Marx resigned with his cabinet on 12 June 1928.

Composition
The Reich cabinet consisted of the following Ministers:

Marx IV
Marx IV
Marx IV
Marx IV